Jack Foley may refer to:
Jack Foley (basketball) (1939–2020), American basketball player
Jack Foley (sound effects artist) (1891–1967), pioneering American sound effects specialist
Jack Foley (poet) (born 1940), American poet

See also
John Foley (disambiguation)

de:Jack Foley